Jean Joseph Denis Pronovost (born December 18, 1945) is a Canadian retired professional ice hockey right winger who played in the National Hockey League for the Pittsburgh Penguins, Atlanta Flames and Washington Capitals.

Biography 
He was acquired by Pittsburgh along with John Arbour from the Boston Bruins on May 21, 1968 for the Penguins 1969 first round draft pick (4th overall Frank Spring) and cash.

Pronovost was a consistent scorer who scored 40 goals four times. He was also the first member of the Pittsburgh Penguins to score 100 points in a season and 50 goals in a season. Pronovost played his junior career with the Niagara Falls Flyers.

He was traded to Atlanta by Pittsburgh for Gregg Sheppard on September 6, 1978 and was sold to Washington by Calgary on July 1, 1980.

Pronovost coached Shawinigan Cataractes of the QMJHL 1994 to 1996; the Quebec Rafales of the IHL 1996-97 and Rouyn-Noranda Huskies (QMJHL) 2000-01.

Awards 
Member of the Trib Total Media Penguins All-Time Team and the Pittsburgh Penguins Hall of Fame

Pictured up in the Ring of Honor that formerly circled in the Pittsburgh Civic Arena

Personal life 
He is also a born-again Christian and worked at Emmanuel Christian School in Dollard des Ormeaux in the West Island of Montreal, Quebec. He is currently retired and living in Calgary with his wife where they attend Rocky Mountain Calvary Chapel .  Two of Jean's older brothers also played in the NHL: Marcel Pronovost and Claude Pronovost.

Career statistics

Regular season and playoffs

International

External links

1945 births
Living people
Atlanta Flames captains
Atlanta Flames players
Canadian Christians
Canadian ice hockey right wingers
Hershey Bears players
Ice hockey people from Quebec
Niagara Falls Flyers players
Oklahoma City Blazers (1965–1977) players
Pittsburgh Penguins players
Rouyn-Noranda Huskies coaches
Shawinigan Cataractes coaches
Sportspeople from Shawinigan
Washington Capitals players
Canadian expatriate ice hockey players in the United States
Canadian ice hockey coaches